Tropical Storm Imelda was a tropical cyclone which was the fourth-wettest storm on record in the U.S. state of Texas, causing devastating and record-breaking floods in southeast Texas. The eleventh tropical cyclone and ninth named storm of the 2019 Atlantic hurricane season, Imelda formed out of an upper-level low that developed in the Gulf of Mexico and moved westward. Little development occurred until the system was near the Texas coastline, where it rapidly developed into a tropical storm before moving ashore shortly afterward on September 17. Imelda weakened after landfall, but continued bringing large amounts of flooding rain to Texas and Louisiana, before dissipating on September 21.

Impacts began when Imelda made landfall as a weak tropical storm. The system brought heavy rain and dangerous flooding to parts of southeastern Texas (especially the cities of Galveston and Beaumont) as its motion gradually slowed over land. Total damage is estimated in excess of $5 billion (2019 USD). Despite the storm causing substantial damage, the name Imelda was not retired following the season, making Imelda the second-costliest Atlantic tropical cyclone name on record to not be retired, with the costliest being Hurricane Sally the following year.

Meteorological history

Imelda originated from a mid-to-upper level trough located over the Eastern United States. Between September 10–12, the low moved to the southwest towards the eastern Gulf of Mexico. Once over the Gulf, associated convection began to increase, as a weak surface trough formed within the upper—level low on September 14, traversing to the west—northwest. That same day, the National Hurricane Center began to monitor the low for possible tropical cyclogenesis. Although, the NHC only gave the disturbance a low chance of formation. By September 17, the system had reached the east coast of Texas. Soon afterward, organization in the system rapidly increased, and at 17:00 UTC that day, the system organized into Tropical Depression Eleven, just off the coast of Texas. At 17:45 UTC, an observation deck at Freeport, Texas recorded sustained winds of 40 mph (65 km/h) with gusts of 47 mph (76 km/h), indicating that the depression had strengthened to Tropical Storm Imelda.

Imelda weakened after landfall, becoming a tropical depression at 03:00 UTC on the next day. At that time, the NHC passed on the responsibility for issuing advisories to the Weather Prediction Center (WPC). Imelda retained status as a tropical depression over land for the next 2 days, gradually weakening and slowing its motion, before degenerating into a trough on September 19, as it began passing over Louisiana; Imelda's remnants continued producing heavy rain and a few isolated tornadoes. Imelda's remnants persisted for another couple of days, before dissipating early on September 21.

Preparations and impact

Texas
Imelda's slow movement over Southeast Texas and a continuous influx of tropical moisture led to copious amounts of rainfall over the region. This moisture supported the formation of rainbands that repeatedly moved across the same areas of Southeast Texas between September 17–19. The same station recorded  of rain in 12 hours. Flood depths in some locations exceeded those recorded in Hurricane Harvey due to the high rainfall rates. Where rainfall was heaviest, the rainfall total represented a 1-in-1000-year rainfall event. Destructive flooding occurred along Interstate 10 between Winnie and Orange, Texas, marooning vehicles for 2.5 days; over a thousand vehicles were caught in these floods. Many homes and businesses were also flooded, resulting in numerous high-water rescues. Approximately 8,200 homes were flooded in Harris, Jefferson, Liberty, and Montgomery counties in Texas. Five deaths were directly attributed to the floods, of which three occurred in Jefferson, while two occurred in Harris County. The National Centers for Environmental Information estimated Imelda inflicted $5 billion in damage.

Jefferson County, Texas, was the county most heavily impacted by Imelda. An estimated 5,100 homes were flooded in the county, suffering $14 million in damage. Major street flooding occurred in Beaumont where the Jefferson County flooding first began. Over  of rain fell in the city. Encroaching floodwaters prompted the evacuation of Riceland Medical Center in Chambers County, Texas. Stream flooding persisted for days in Hardin County, Texas, where  of rain was measured. Many buildings and roads were rendered impassable. Sixty homes were flooded in the county, resulting in $2.3 million in damage. In Orange County, Texas, Imelda flooded 2,679 homes, resulting in $12 million in damage. Near Mauriceville, Cow Bayou reached its second-highest crest on record. In Jasper and Newton counties in Texas, an estimated $2.4 million in damage was incurred following the flooding of 15 homes.

In Houston, Imelda's rainfall caused many of the local bayous to overtop their banks and flood residential areas. More than 1,000 people were rescued from floodwaters. All bus and rail services were temporarily shut down in the city. A roof of a United States Postal Service building collapsed, leaving three people with minor injuries. George Bush Intercontinental Airport closed for about 90 minutes due to flooding on the runways, canceling 655 flights. Throughout Houston, hundreds of homes were affected by flooding and more than 1,600 vehicles were towed. In Harris County alone, 422 people required high-water rescue; the Texas National Guard rescued 130 people. During the flood, nine barges escaped a shipyard, and at least two struck the Interstate 10 bridge over the San Jacinto River, causing visible damage to some of the columns supporting the highway. The bridge was subsequently closed to traffic in both directions. Significant flooding occurred in Splendora, inundating parts of FM 2090 and U.S. 59, as well as gas pumps at a filling station.

Elsewhere

Flooding from Imelda in southwestern Louisiana was relatively minor. Freshwater flooding in Johnson Bayou inundated most secondary roads and was augmented by the elevated tide levels caused by the tropical storm. Heavy rainfall also occurred in portions of Arkansas.

In addition to the rain, weather stations reported winds between 37 and 44 mph (59–70 km/h) as Imelda made landfall. At Baton Rouge Metropolitan Airport, an embedded thunderstorm within one of Imelda's rainbands produced a microburst that flipped four airplanes and damaged hangar doors on September 17; the airport registered a peak gust of 66 mph (106 km/h). After September 17, freshwater runoff originating from inland flooding reached the coast and exacerbated the initial storm surge flooding.

Aftermath and records

Imelda is currently the 7th wettest tropical cyclone to impact the United States, 5th wettest in the contiguous United States and the 4th wettest overall in the U.S state of Texas.

Within the weeks following Imelda, aid from FEMA was not received, leaving some residents uncertain if any would come.

See also

 Tropical cyclones in 2019
 List of Texas hurricanes (1980–present)
 List of wettest tropical cyclones in the United States
 Tropical Storm Allison (1989) – A tropical storm that had similar intensity, stalled over Eastern Texas/Western Louisiana, causing $560 million with severe flooding.
 Tropical Storm Allison (2001) – Another system of a similar intensity that stalled over Texas and caused severe flooding.
 Hurricane Harvey (2017) – A Category 4 hurricane that also caused catastrophic flooding in the same region when it stalled as a tropical storm.

References

External links 

 The NHC's Advisory Archive on Tropical Storm Imelda
 The WPC's Advisory Archive on Tropical Storm Imelda
 The Weather Prediction Center's storm summaries on Tropical Storm Imelda 

Imelda
Tropical cyclones that lingered over Texas
Hurricanes in Louisiana
Atlantic tropical storms
Imelda
Floods in Texas